The Shakey's V-League 10th Season: 1st Conference is the eighteenth conference of Shakey's V-League, a collegiate women's volleyball league in the Philippines founded in 2004. The opening ceremonies was held on April 7, 2013 with the first doubleheader of volleyball games at the Filoil Flying V Arena in San Juan. There are three new teams who are participating in this season, they are the Arellano University Lady Chiefs, De La Salle University - Dasmariñas Lady Patriots, and the University of San Carlos Lady Warriors. This three new teams will face the seven current participating teams like ADMU, AdU, UST, NU, SSC-R, UPHSD and CSJL.

At the end of the elimination round, the Lady Eagles of the Ateneo de Manila University and the Lady Bulldogs of the National University emerged on the top of standings in their respective group via complete sweep 4–0. Meanwhile, the  Collegio de San Juan de Letran of Group A and the Lady Warriors of the University of San Carlos of Group B finish winless and bid their goodbye in the conference as both teams were eliminated for their hope to enter the quarterfinal round.

The games become intense on the Quarterfinals wherein ADMU, UST, NU and AdU became the Final 4 teams to enter the Semifinals. NU and ADMU became victorious on their assignments, and became the finalists for the title, leaving AdU and UST battling for the bronze. This is NU's first Finals appearance, and still they are searching for their first ever championship of the League, while ADMU is looking for a 3-peat, as they are the 1st conference's champions of Seasons 8 and 9.

Due to vastly increase of volleyball fans and spectators, the management decided to look for more venues that can accommodate large number of crowd. This is the first time that the League held its games on the state of the art Mall of Asia Arena, and in the iconic Philsports Arena during Semifinals, Battle for 3rd, and Championship matches.

On May 26, 2013 (Game 2 of the Finals and Battle for 3rd), Shakey's V-League held its first live telecast on TV via GMA News TV. It continued to air live until the Game 3 of the series (Finals and Battle for 3rd). This is also the league's first time to have Game 3 matches on both Finals and Battle for 3rd. NU Lady Bulldogs snatched their first ever championship over ADMU Lady Eagles, while the UST Tigresses overcome AdU Lady Falcons for the Bronze.

Participants 
The conference is composed of 10 teams, grouped into two pools, each consisting of five squads.

Season's Line-Up (Regular Players)

Pool A

Pool B

List of Guest Players 

Pool A

Note: Jaroensri Bualee replaced Aeriel Patnongon as the other Guest Player for Ateneo Lady Eagles before the start of the Semifinals.

Pool B

List of Coaches & Staffs 

Pool A

POOL B

Tournament format
Preliminaries
The ten (10) participating teams will be divided into two pools. The top four (4) teams in each pool will advance to the quarterfinals.
In the event of a two-way tie for 4th place, the tie will be resolved by a play-off game.
Quarter-finals
The number one and number three seeded teams in each pool will be taken and will compose a new pool while the number two and number four seeded teams will make up the other pool. 
Another round robin will be played in the set of pools with the record of a team against another team whom they previously met in the eliminations will be carried over.
If two teams are tied for 2nd place, FIVB Rules shall apply to determine the best two which will play-off to resolve the tie.
Semi-finals
A best-of-three series will be played between the 1st seed of a pool and the 2nd seed of the other pool.
Finals
A best-of-three series will be played between the 2 winners of the semis for the gold.
A best-of-three series will be played between the 2 losers of the semis for the bronze.
If the gold medalist is determined in two (2) games, the series for the bronze medal will also end in two (2) games. If the contenders for the bronze are tied after two (2) games, then FIVB Rules will determine the winner.

Eliminations

Pool A

Pool B

Quarterfinals

Pool C

Pool D

Bracket

Semifinals

UST vs. Ateneo

Ateneo leads series, 1-0

Ateneo wins series, 2-0

NU vs. Adamson

Adamson leads series, 1-0

NU ties the series, 1-1

NU wins series, 2-1

Finals

Bronze series

Adamson leads series, 1-0

UST ties the series, 1-1

UST won the series, 2-1

Championship Series

Ateneo leads series, 1-0

NU ties the series, 1-1

NU won the series, 2-1

Final standings

Individual awards
 Best Scorer: (C) Aleona Denise Santiago
 Best Attacker: Myla Pablo
 Best Blocker: Maika Ortiz
 Best Server: Alyssa Valdez
 Best Digger: (G) Jaroensri Bualee
 Best Setter: (G) Rubie De Leon
 Best Receiver: (L) Jennylyn Reyes
 Most Improved Player: Pamela Tricia Lastimosa
 Most Valuable Player of the Season: (C) Aleona Denise Santiago
 Most Valuable Player of the Finals: (G) Rubie De Leon
 Note: 
 (G) - Guest Player
 (C) - Team Captain
 (L) - Libero

References

http://www.v-league.ph/
http://tmxsports.com/shakeys-v-league-season-x/1st-conference/v-leagues-stats/

Shakey's V-League season 10 1st Conference 

Shakey's V-League conferences
2013 in Philippine sport
2013 in volleyball